Tiarnan King is a Canadian soccer forward who played professionally in the USL First Division, National Professional Soccer League and Ireland.  He earned two caps with the Canadian National Futsal Team in 2004.

Club
King attended Simon Fraser University, playing on the men's soccer team.  In 1999, he played for the Vancouver Explorers in the Pacific Coast Soccer League.  That fall, he moved to Burbaby Canadians of the Vancouver Metro League.  In February 2000, the Vancouver 86ers selected King in the A-League Draft.   he began the 2000 season with Vancouver's reserve team, the Abbotsford 86ers, but joined the first team on June 15, 2000.  King would play each summer, outdoor season with Vancouver (renamed the Whitecaps in 2001) until 2003.  In the fall of 2000, King went indoors with the Edmonton Drillers of the National Professional Soccer League.  When the Drillers folded in December 2000, King was not selected in the dispersal draft.  He also spent six months with Bray Wanderers in Ireland, but played only for the team's reserve squad.

International
In 2004, King earned two caps with the Canadian National Futsal Team.  Both came in the CONCACAF Futsal championship.

References

External links
 Midfielder Tiarnan King Signs
 

Living people
1976 births
Canadian men's futsal players
Canadian soccer players
Canadian expatriate soccer players
Edmonton Drillers (1996–2000) players
Fraser Valley Mariners players
National Professional Soccer League (1984–2001) players
Simon Fraser Clan men's soccer players
Soccer people from British Columbia
Sportspeople from New Westminster
Vancouver Whitecaps (1986–2010) players
USL First Division players
Association football forwards
Bray Wanderers F.C. players